Alcohol dehydrogenase class-3 is an enzyme that in humans is encoded by the ADH5 gene.

This gene encodes glutathione-dependent formaldehyde dehydrogenase or the class III alcohol dehydrogenase chi subunit, which is a member of the alcohol dehydrogenase family. Members of this family metabolize a wide variety of substrates, including ethanol, retinol, other aliphatic alcohols, hydroxysteroids, and lipid peroxidation products. Class III alcohol dehydrogenase is a homodimer composed of 2 chi subunits. It has virtually no activity for ethanol oxidation, but exhibits high activity for oxidation of long-chain primary alcohols and for oxidation of S-hydroxymethyl-glutathione, a spontaneous adduct between formaldehyde and glutathione.

This enzyme is an important component of cellular metabolism for the elimination of formaldehyde, a potent irritant and sensitizing agent that causes lacrymation, rhinitis, pharyngitis, and contact dermatitis.

Clinical significance
Mutations of the ADH5 gene cause AMED syndrome, an autosomal recessive digenic multisystem disorder characterized by global developmental delay with impaired intellectual development. The syndrome was first described in 2020.

References

Further reading

External links